Caleta de Carquin District is one of twelve districts of the province Huaura in Peru.

References